Mikhail Izrailevich Armalinsky (born Peltsman) (Russian: Михаил Израилевич Армалинский) born in Leningrad, USSR on April 23, 1947 is a Russian poet, writer, blogger and publisher of erotica. He caused scandal and outrage within Russian literary circles, following publication in 1986 of a pornographically-toned diary, ostensibly by Alexander Pushkin. This led to him being described as "The Pushkin pornographer".

Biography 

Mikhail Armalinsky lived all his life in Leningrad till his emigration to the United States on November 17, 1976. He received master's degree in Electrical Engineering from Leningrad Electro-Technical Institute (1964-1970) and actively participated in Leningrad literary underground. He published three samizdat books of poetry there.

After emigrating to the US in 1976 and settling in Minneapolis, Minnesota in 1977 he worked as engineer and in 1979 started with his father, inventor Israel Peltsman, the machine building company Peltsman Corporation. At the same time Mikhail Armalinsky kept working on his literary works and in 1984 started his own publishing house M.I.P. Company.

Creative output 
Mikhail Armalinsky is the author of many books of poetry, prose, essays (see below Selected publications).
In 1986 Mikhail Armalinsky published Secret Journal 1836-1837 by Alexander Pushkin in Russian and then English translation. This book created a scandal in Russia and was published in 25 countries

Excerpts from Secret Journal 1836-1837 were published in Penthouse Forum, February, 1991, p. 50-53, 84, 86.

Response of Russian media to this book is documented in several editions of Parapushkinistika by David Bayevsky, published by Armalinsky's publishing house M.I.P. Company.

Banned in Russia the Secret Journal was first published in 2001 by Moscow publishing house Ladomir that was threatened and prosecuted for publishing "pornographic blasphemy".

In 2006 Secret Journal was staged in Paris, France.

Some attributed the authorship of the Secret Journal to Armalinsky himself.
Dr. Lee B. Croft: "The pornographic nature of those notes, clearly of a modern Western stripe, drew apoplectic reaction from the Soviet literary authorities who first encountered them. One legal authority, in a sidebar to an article on this "hoax" in Ogonek magazine,suggested that Armalinsky be castrated for so besmirching the hallowed name of Pushkin.
...his clear feeling of "kinship" with Pushkin and his choice of Pushkin's persona to gain attention for his own literary endeavors, which have, especially since his emigration to the United States in the early 1980s, taken on a pornographic character strikingly similar to the notes he attributes to Pushkin."

Since 1999 Mikhail Armalinsky publishes his blog in Russian named General Erotic (GE) where he publishes his short stories, observations, reviews and essays.

In 1989 a variation on the United States flag designed by Mikhail Armalinsky made the cover of New York City weekly Screw.

On September 22, 2003 Armalinsky sent announcements to the media and about his death to check out what would be a reaction to his death. In two months he "resurrected".

Selected publications 
 Russian
Vrazumlenniye Strasty (Smart Passions), poems, Los Angeles; 1980, 72 p.
Sostoyanie (The Status), poems, Sovremennik, Toronto, 1979, 94 p. No ISBN
Mayatnik (The Pendulum), poems, Minneapolis, 1978, 128 p.
Po napravleniyu k sebe (Towards Myself), poems, Los Angeles; 1980, 106 p.
Posle proshlogo (After the Past), poems, Hermitage, Ann Arbor, 1982, 108 p.
Muskulistaya smert (Muscular Death), short stories, Minneapolis, 1984, 150 p.
Po obye storoni orgasma (On Both Sides of Orgasm), poems, Minneapolis, 1988, 150 p.
Dobrovolniye Priznaniya – Vinuzhdenaya Perepiska (Voluntary Confessions – Forced Correspondence), novel, Minneapolis, 1991, 312 p.
Dvoistveynnie Otnosheniya. Izlublennie Rasskazi (Ambivalent Relationships. Favorite Stories), Minneapolis, 1993, 68 p.
Vplotnuyu (Close To), poems, Minneapolis, 1994, 100 p.
Gonimoye Chudo (Expelled Miracle) Short stories, fairytale and essay, Minneapolis, 1996, 130 p.
Zhizneopisaniye Mgnovenia (Biography of the Moment), Poems 1994 - 1997; Minneapolis, 1997, 92 p.
Chtob znali! (So That Your Know!), Moscow, Ladomir, 2002, 860 p.
Chto Mozhet Bit Luchshe? (What Can Be Better?), Moscow, Ladomir, 2012, 528 p.
Aromat Griaznogo Belia. Zamislovatiye Biografii (The Scent of Dirty Laundry. Complicated Biographies) Moscow, Ladomir, 2013, 584 p.
Maximalizmi. (Maximalizms) Moscow, Ladomir, 2013, 544 p.
Pravota Zhelanii (Rightness of Desires), Moscow, Ladomir, 2017, 512 p.

 Edited
Soitiye. Almanak Russkoi Eroticheskoi Literaturi (Copulation. The Almanac of Russian Erotic Literature), Minneapolis, 1989, 184 p.
Russkie Bestizhie Poslovitsi i Pogovorki (Russian Shameless Proverbs and Sayings), Minneapolis, 1995, 76 p.
Detskii Eroticheski Folklor. (Children's Erotic Folklore), Minneapolis, 1995, 91 p.

 Translations
Markiz de Sad Filosofia v Buduare (Marquis de Sade. Philosophy in the Bedroom) Minneapolis, 1993, 196 p.

 English
The Deal, Short story, "Confrontation" Exile and the Writer, a literary journal of Long Island University Nos. 27-28, 1984
Hero, Short story, Mid-American Review, a literary journal of Bowling Green State University, Volume VI, Number 2, 1986
Nothing in Mail Short Story in “Bodies,” issue of Two Lines, A Journal of Translation, issue XII, San Francisco, 2005 p. 52-73
Prostitution Divine. Short stories, movie script and essay (Kindle ebook), Minneapolis, 2014, 246 p.

References

Other sources 

 Scholarly presentations in the US on Mikhail Armalinsky

·     "Russia Fails at Pushkin: Mikhail Armalinsky’s Publication of Pushkin A .S. Secret Notes 1836-1837" by Jasmina Savic, University of Illinois, on November 19, 2016 at the ASEEES (Association for Slavic, East European and Eurasian Studies) Annual Convention.

·     "Into the Bright Future: Mikhail Armalinsky’s Literary Revolution and Poetics of Porn"  by Jasmina Savic, on October 28, 2016 at the University of Illinois, Noontime Scholar Lecture.

·     “On The Battlefield of Porn: Mikhail Armalinsky’s publication of Pushkin A .S. Secret Notes 1836-1837”  by Jasmina Savic, University of Illinois, on October 23, 2015 at Central Slavic Conference, Saint Louis University, St. Louis, Missouri

·     "Seeking Mikhail Armalinsky: Constructing and Reading the Self in an Age of Digital Revolution" by Emily D. Johnson, University of Oklahoma, on November 21, 2013 at the Annual Convention of the Association for Slavic, East European, and Eurasian Studies (ASEEES) in Boston MA.

·    Tatiana Shemetova PUSHKIN – «DON JUAN» IN THE INTERPRETATION OF P. HUBER AND M. ARMALINSKIY
see ANUARI DE FILOLOGIA. LLENGÜES I LITERATURES MODERNES (Anu.Filol.Lleng.Lit.Mod.) 9/2019, pp. 53-57, ISSN: 2014-1394

External links 

 M.I.P. Company, Mikhail Armalinsky site
 Russian Wikipedia article on Mikhail Armalinsky

Encyclopedia "Moscow Talks" (in Russian)
 Penthouse (Moscow) December 2007

1947 births
Living people